Dania Popescu (born 11 June 1956) is a Romanian equestrian. She competed in the team jumping event at the 1980 Summer Olympics.

References

External links
 

1956 births
Living people
Romanian female equestrians
Olympic equestrians of Romania
Equestrians at the 1980 Summer Olympics
Sportspeople from Bucharest